Lisa Selesner (born May 26, 1978), professionally known as Lisa S., is an American international model, actress and Channel V veejay based in Hong Kong.

Early life
Lisa Selesner was born on May 26, 1978 in Monaco to an American mother and a father of French and Chinese descent. She was raised in New York City where she was talent-scouted to be a model at age 14. She was raised by her mother and her stepfather, Gary Selesner, who is the president of Caesars Palace.

She stated that she shortened her surname from Selesner to the initial "S" because after moving to Hong Kong in 2000, "no one could pronounce it".

Career 
In Hong Kong, she became a top model who lent her exotic looks to fashion catwalks and appeared in advertisements for brands like Citibank, De Beers diamonds, and Olay skincare. She has been described as a "bewitching designer-clad international model." She hosted a lifestyle programme on TV in Hong Kong. She also starred in three Hong Kong movies: Silver Hawk (2004), Rob-B-Hood (2006), A Mob Story (2007) and cameoed in the Chinese movie Inseparable (2011) which starred Daniel Wu and Kevin Spacey.

She is the founder of the monthly beauty box subscription 'Glamabox' which is provided in China, Taiwan, Hong Kong and Singapore.

Personal life 
On April 6, 2010, Lisa S. married Daniel Wu in South Africa, after eight years of dating. Their daughter, Raven, was born in 2013. Prior to their marriage, their privacy was occasionally invaded by paparazzi.

Both Lisa and Wu are godparents to Ase Wang's daughter.

References

External links
 Official Blog of Lisa S.
 
 

1978 births
Living people
American expatriates in Hong Kong
American female models
American people of French-Jewish descent
VJs (media personalities)
Jewish American actresses
Jewish female models
Monegasque emigrants to the United States
Actresses from New York (state)
21st-century American actresses
21st-century American Jews